Charles Frederick DeShane (December 10, 1918 – November 5, 2006) was a professional American football player in the National Football League for the Detroit Lions from 1945 to 1949.

Career
Born in Waukesha, Wisconsin, DeShane was the starting quarterback for the University of Alabama in 1939 and 1940 and was named to the All-Southeastern Conference team his senior season. He coached football from 1942 to 1944 at his alma mater, Creston High School (Grand Rapids, Michigan), before signing with the Lions.

From 1945 to 1946, Deshane played quarterback and linebacker for the Lions. He played guard from 1947 to 1949.

Personal life
DeShane was also a railroad conductor during the offseasons.  He was married to his second wife Evelyn for 31 years and had four children with his wife Lorraine, 14 grandchildren and 21 great-grandchildren. He died in Grand Rapids, Michigan.  He was preceded in death by his daughter, Pamela Rae and his son, Robert Floyd.  His son Charles Jr and daughter Sandra survive.

External links

Database Football
Detroit Free Press obituary

1918 births
2006 deaths
Sportspeople from Waukesha, Wisconsin
Players of American football from Wisconsin
Players of American football from Grand Rapids, Michigan
American football linebackers
American football quarterbacks
American football offensive guards
Alabama Crimson Tide football players
Detroit Lions players
Sportspeople from the Milwaukee metropolitan area
Conductor (rail)